Maxville may refer to:
In the United States
Maxville, Randolph County, Indiana, an unincorporated community
Maxville, Spencer County, Indiana, an unincorporated community
Maxville, Missouri
Maxville, Montana
Maxville, Ohio, an unincorporated community
Maxville, Wisconsin, a town
Maxville (community), Wisconsin, an unincorporated community

Elsewhere
Maxville, Ontario, par of North Glengarry, Ontario, Canada